Henry Finch Holland (1912–1962) was a United States lawyer who served as Assistant Secretary of State for Inter-American Affairs from 1954 to 1956.

Biography

Henry F. Holland was born in 1912 and raised in Brownsville, Texas.  He spent his high school years at Sewanee Military Academy in Sewanee, Tennessee.  He then attended Sewanee: The University of the South and, after that, the University of Texas School of Law.

After law school, Holland established a law practice in Texas.  Holland joined the United States Foreign Service in 1942. His first post as a Foreign Service Officer was to the United States Embassy in Mexico  With the end of World War II, Holland left the foreign service in 1945 and resumed the private practice of law. His practice involved international law and in the early 1950s, he was involved in the activities of the International Law Commission.

In 1954, President of the United States Dwight D. Eisenhower named Holland Assistant Secretary of State for Inter-American Affairs and, after Senate confirmation, Holland held this post from March 2, 1954 until September 13, 1956.  In this capacity, he was assistant chief of the United States delegation at the tenth Pan-American Conference, held in Caracas in March 1954.  He later headed the U.S. delegation to the Inter-American Conference on resources of the sea.

Holland served as international affairs adviser to the Republican Party during the 1956 election campaign.  After leaving public office, Holland moved to New York City and, with Sidney I. Roberts, founded the law firm of Roberts & Holland.

Holland died at Greenwich Hospital in Greenwich, Connecticut on July 18, 1962, at the age of 49.

References

External links
Photographs of Henry F. Holland from Life magazine

1912 births
1962 deaths
United States Assistant Secretaries of State
People from Brownsville, Texas
Sewanee: The University of the South alumni
University of Texas School of Law alumni
Texas lawyers
20th-century American lawyers
American expatriates in Mexico